Otto Planetta (2 August 1899 – 31 July 1934) was an Austrian National Socialist who assassinated the Chancellor of Austria, Engelbert Dollfuß, in 1934.

Biography 
Planetta was born into a Catholic family in Wischau, Austria-Hungary (now Vyskov, Czech Republic) in 1899. In 1916 he volunteered for military service in the Austro-Hungarian Army. After the collapse of Austria-Hungary in 1918 at the end of World War I, he joined the Volkswehr, then the Gendarmerie as well as the Bundesheer, the successor of the Volkswehr after 1920. His last military rank was that of staff sergeant. By trade he was a retail salesman. At the time of his death he was married but had no children and lived on Laxenburger Street in Favoriten, the 10th district of Vienna.

In 1930 he joined the Nazi Party (member number 300,772) and, together with Fridolin Glass and Franz Holzweber founded the "German Soldiers' Association for the Registration of National Socialists in the Austrian Armed Forces". In 1933, while he was unemployed, he played a leading role in the formation of SS Standarte 89 (later SS-Standarte 89 "Holzweber"), which was created under the direct orders of Adolf Hitler to be a group of shock troops designed to create chaos on the streets of Austria.

On July 25, 1934, at the beginning of the July Putsch, a failed coup attempt by Austrian Nazis, Planetta fired one of two fatal shots at Austrian Chancellor Engelbert Dollfuß. On July 31, a military tribunal sentenced him and his accomplice, Franz Holzweber, to death for murder and high treason. The two were hanged by the executioner Johann Lang in the Vienna Regional Court on July 31. On the court's instructions, Planetta was the second to be hanged. His last words were "Heil Hitler." Their bodies were not handed over to the relatives but instead cremated in the Simmering crematorium. Planetta's ashes were later buried in the Dornbach Cemetery (Group 13, Row 3, No. 33).

Glorification in the Nazi State 
After the Anschluss of Austria on March 12, 1938, Planetta was elevated to the status of a "Hero of Austrian Freedom". Numerous streets in "Greater Germany" were named after him, such as Gemmrigheimer Street in Zuffenhausen, Pfarrgasse in Baden bei Wien and Habsburger Street in Dresden. Today's Maria- and Rudolf-Fischer-Hof in Vienna-Favoriten as well as student fraternities, e.g. the fraternity Bruna Sudetia in Vienna, were also named after him. None of these still bear his name.

See also 

 Liste der 1933 bis 1938 nach österreichischem Recht Hingerichteten (List of those executed between 1933 and 1938 under Austrian law)
 Photographs of Planetta
 Website with photo of Planetta’s grave at the Dornbacher Cemetery in Vienna.

Literature (selection) 

 Walter Kleindel with the collaboration of Hans Veigl: Das große Buch der Österreicher. 4500 Personendarstellungen in Wort und Bild. Namen, Daten, Fakten. Kremayr & Scheriau, Wien 1987, .
 Robert Berger (Ed.), Peter Krause, Gottfried Stangler: Gaudeamus igitur. Studentisches Leben einst und jetzt. Schallaburg, 28. Mai bis 18. Oktober 1992. Ausstellungskatalog. Katalog des Niederösterreichischen Landesmuseums, Band N.F. 296, . Amt der Niederösterreichischen Landesregierung, Abt. III/2, Kulturabteilung, Wien 1992, .
 Assassination in Vienna, by Walter B. Maass, published by Charles Scribners's Sons, New York
 The Order of the Death's Head: The Story of Hitler's SS, by Heinz Zollin Höhne and Richard Barry
 První zemřel kancléř, by Vladimír Bauman a Miroslav Hladký, Praha 1968
 Na dně byla smrt, by Otakar Brožek a Jiří Horský, Praha 1968

References

1899 births
1934 deaths
People from Vyškov
Austrian soldiers
SS personnel
Austrian assassins
Assassins of heads of state
Austrian people of Moravian-German descent
Austrian Roman Catholics
Austro-Hungarian military personnel of World War I
Executed Austrian Nazis
Nazis executed in Austria
People convicted of murder by Austria
People executed by Austria by hanging
People from the Margraviate of Moravia
People executed for treason against Austria
Executed assassins
Moravian-German people